Mental Manja is a 2005 Indian Kannada-language romance film directed by Sai Sagar. The film stars newcomers Arjun and Sheethal. The story of this movie shares many similarities to 1995 Kannada movie Om with slight changes. The film was a box office success and ran for fifty days. Arjun earned the name Mental Star from this film. A film titled Mental Manja 2 was announced, but it is not a sequel to this film.

Cast

 Arjun as Manjunath alias Manja/Mental Manja
 Sheethal as Priya
 Vijay
 Huccha Venkat
 Ramesh Bhat
 Ashalatha
 Girija Lokesh
 Sathyajith
 M D Kaushik
 Tennis Krishna
 Mandeep Roy
 Biradar
 Sai Sagar

Production 
The film had a tagline saying that it was only for smart people.

Soundtrack
Music composer Sai Sagar developed the score and soundtrack. The lyrics were written by Sai Sagar.
Lahari Music Company took the copyrights for this movie sound track. The song "Chembu Chembu" is based on "Hawa Hawa" by Pakistani singer Hasan Jahangir.

Awards
Udaya Film Awards 2006
Best Debut Actor - Arjun

References

External links

2005 films
2000s Kannada-language films
2005 romantic comedy films
Indian romantic comedy films
Films shot in Karnataka